Ekanayake Rajapakse Kodippilli Dissanayake Mudiyanseralahamilaye Hector Deheragoda was the 26th Solicitor General of Ceylon. He was appointed on 1970, succeeding L. B. T. Premaratne, and held the office until 1972. He was succeeded by R. S. Wanasundera.

References

D